The 2009 season was the Hawthorn Football Club's 85th season in the Australian Football League and 108th overall. Hawthorn entered the season as the defending AFL Premiers

Playing list changes

Draft

AFL draft

Rookie draft

Retirements and delistings

2009 Player squad

Schedule

NAB Cup

Premiership Season

Ladder

References

External links
 Official website of the Hawthorn Football Club
 Official website of the Australian Football League 

2009 in Australian rules football
2009
2009 Australian Football League season